Paul-Jan Bakker (born 19 August 1957) is a former Dutch cricketer. Bakker was a right-handed batsman and a right-arm medium-fast bowler.

International career
An accurate seam bowler, Bakker made his ICC Trophy debut in 1986, taking 5/18 against Papua New Guinea. In 1989 he took an impressive 3/20 for the Netherlands in a limited-over match against a strong touring Australia side, his wickets including Mark Taylor and Dean Jones, who had both just dominated England bowlers in a test match series. (This game did not have full One Day International status.) He played all five One Day Internationals for The Netherlands during the 1996 Cricket World Cup, including his country's first official ODI against New Zealand at the advanced age of 38. Quirkily, his solitary ODI run was an umpiring error against UAE at Lahore. The final delivery of the Dutch innings yielded a scampered bye to keeper Abbasi but without an umpire signal – with contact he would have been caught behind! After the 1996 World Cup Bakker retired from cricket.

Career in England
Between 1986 and 1992 Bakker played for Hampshire in the English County Championship (being their leading wicket taker in 1989).

References

 Paul-Jan Bakker on Cricinfo

1957 births
Living people
Netherlands One Day International cricketers
Dutch cricketers
Hampshire cricketers
People from Vlaardingen
Coaches of the Netherlands national cricket team
Dutch cricket coaches
Sportspeople from South Holland